Sweet Fanny Adams is the second album by Sweet, their first of two released in 1974, and also their first album simply as Sweet. The album was a turning point and change in the band's sound. It featured more of a hard rock sound than their previous pop records.

The album title is English (originally Royal Navy) slang originating from the murder of eight-year-old Fanny Adams in 1867 and means "nothing at all" as well as a similar euphemism "F.A." = "fuck all".

Sweet Fanny Adams reached No. 27 on the UK Albums Chart in the year of its release by RCA Records in 1974 and No. 2 in the albums chart of West Germany. It was not released in the US, but five of its tracks appeared on the US version of the album Desolation Boulevard released in July 1975.

Track listing
All songs written and composed by Brian Connolly, Steve Priest, Andy Scott, and Mick Tucker except where noted.
Side one
"Set Me Free" (Scott) – 3:57
"Heartbreak Today" – 5:02
"No You Don't" (Mike Chapman, Nicky Chinn) – 4:35
"Rebel Rouser" – 3:25
"Peppermint Twist"  (Joey Dee, Henry Glover) – 3:29
Side two
"Sweet F.A." – 6:15
"Restless" – 4:29
"Into the Night" (Scott) – 4:26
"AC-DC" (Chapman, Chinn) – 3:29

Bonus tracks on 1997 reissue
"The Ballroom Blitz" (Chapman, Chinn) – 4:03
"Teenage Rampage" - 3:34

Bonus tracks on 1999 reissue
"Burn on the Flame" – 3:37
"Own Up, Take a Look at Yourself"  – 3:57

Bonus tracks on 2005 reissue
"Block Buster!" (Chapman, Chinn) – 3:12
"Need a Lot of Lovin'" – 3:00
"Hell Raiser" (Chapman, Chinn) – 3:26
"Burning" – 4:04
"The Ballroom Blitz" (Chapman, Chinn) – 3:56
"Rock 'n' Roll Disgrace" – 3.50

Songs covered by other artists
 "Set Me Free" was covered by NWOBHM band Saxon on their 1984 album Crusader, American thrash metal band Heathen on their 1987 debut album Breaking the Silence, Seattle punk rockers Fastbacks on their 1987 debut album ...And His Orchestra, Mötley Crüe vocalist Vince Neil on his 1993 solo debut Exposed, Eric Singer Project on the 1998 album Lost and Spaced, and Christian metal act Stryper on 2011's The Covering.
 "No You Don't" was covered by Pat Benatar on her 1979 debut album In the Heat of the Night and by Jean Beauvoir's Crown of Thorns on their 1993 self-titled album. 
 "AC-DC" was covered by Joan Jett on her 2006 album Sinner as the title "A.C.D.C.", as well as by Vince Neil on his 2010 album Tattoos & Tequila as "AC/DC".

Influence
The late 1980s Indiana-based glam metal band Sweet F.A., which released a pair of major-label albums in 1989 and 1991, named themselves after the Sweet song. English rock group Love and Rockets titled their 1996 album  Sweet F.A..

Personnel
Sweet
Brian Connolly – lead vocals (except as noted)
Steve Priest – bass guitar, lead vocals (tracks 3, 7), backing vocals
Andy Scott – guitars, lead vocals (track 8), backing vocals
Mick Tucker – drums, backing vocals

Charts

Weekly charts

Year-end charts

Certifications and sales

References

External links

The Sweet albums
1974 albums
Albums produced by Phil Wainman
RCA Records albums